I'm a Woman may refer to:

I'm a Woman (Peggy Lee album) (1963)
I'm a Woman (Elisabeth Andreassen album) (1983)
I'm a Woman (Shannon Bex album) (2012)
"I'm a Woman" (song), 1962 song first recorded by Christine Kittrell